The 2008 New York State Legislature primary election took place on September 9, 2008, and the general election was held on November 4, 2008. All 150 members of the New York State Assembly and all 62 seats of the New York State Senate were up for election. Members of the Assembly and the State Senate serve two-year terms. The State Senate was heavily contested, as the Republicans held a one-seat majority going into the election.

The election saw the Democrats take control of the State Senate and gain one seat in the State Assembly.

New York State Assembly

New York State Senate

See also
2009 New York State Senate leadership crisis
New York state elections

References

External links
 2008 New York State Senate election results
 2008 New York State Assembly election results

Assembly
New York State Assembly elections
New York